Downtown Largo is an island-platformed Washington Metro station in Lake Arbor census-designated place, unincorporated Prince George's County, Maryland, United States, with a Largo postal address.

The station was opened on December 18, 2004, as Largo Town Center and is operated by the Washington Metropolitan Area Transit Authority (WMATA). Providing service for the Blue and Silver Lines, it is the eastern terminus of the Blue and Silver Lines, and serves the town of Largo and The Boulevard at the Capital Centre.

Downtown Largo is also a major commuter station, with two parking garages, containing a total of 2,200 spaces, connected by a bridge at the top level.

History
In 1980, Herbert Harris and other local legislators introduced legislation to study the feasibility of constructing an additional  to the original  network. Included in this request was a previously considered  extension of the Blue Line through Largo en route to a proposed terminus at Bowie.

In October 1996, the proposed routing for the extension of the Blue Line to Largo received a favorable environmental impact statement thus allowing for the project to move forward. The plan represented the first expansion to the original  Metro network and would include both the then named Summerfield and Largo stations. The station gained approval from Congress as part of the extension in February 2000 with the federal government contributing $259 million towards its construction.

Construction began in 2001, and the station opened as Largo Town Center on December 18, 2004. The final cost of building it, its sister station and rail extension was $456 million.

In December 2012, the station was one of five added to the route of the Silver Line, which was originally supposed to end at the Stadium–Armory station but was extended into Prince George's County, Maryland to Largo due to safety concerns about a pocket track just past Stadium–Armory. Therefore, the station is also the eastern terminus of the Silver Line, which began service on July 26, 2014.

On January 13, 2022, WMATA's Safety and Operations Committee recommended the name of the station be changed to Downtown Largo after conducting a brief public opinion survey.  The new name became effective on September 11, 2022.

Station layout

Notable places nearby 
 The Boulevard at the Capital Centre
 Six Flags America
 FedEx Field
 Prince George's Community College

References

External links

Washington Metro stations in Maryland
Stations on the Blue Line (Washington Metro)
Stations on the Silver Line (Washington Metro)
Railway stations in the United States opened in 2004
2004 establishments in Maryland
Railway stations in Prince George's County, Maryland